Villa Malfitano Whitaker is a 19th-century villa in Via Dante, in the quarter of Politeama of Palermo, Sicily. It is presently a museum displaying Whitaker's natural history and archaeological collections, as well as his artwork.

History
The villa was built between 1886 and 1889 for the Anglo-Sicilian businessman Joseph Whitaker and his wife Tina Whitaker. It was designed by the architect Ignazio Greco and represents a synthesis of Neo-Renaissance and Eclecticism styles. The state rooms were frescoed with a rich floral trompe-l’oeil decoration by Ettore De Maria Bergler. Other smaller rooms have Flemish tapestries with scenes from the Aeneid and frescoes by Rocco Lentini and stuccoes by Salvatore Valenti.

The garden of the villa was designed by Emilio Kunzmann and covers about seven hectares. Many rare plants from Tunisia, Sumatra, Australia and South America are located in it.

During the Belle Époque age the villa was the venue for lavish parties. The Whitaker family knew artists like Richard Wagner and the imperial dynasties of Great Britain, Germany and Russia.

The villa is currently the headquarters of the Whitaker Foundation.

References

External links 

 Official site of the Whitaker Foundation

Malfitano
Gardens in Palermo
Eclectic architecture in Palermo
Renaissance Revival architecture in Italy